Kemerçam is a village in the Tercan District, Erzincan Province, Turkey. The village is populated by Kurds of the Çarekan tribe and had a population of 53 in 2021.

The hamlets of Abbaslar, Dilek, Kemeroğlu and Kızkale are attached to the village.

References 

Villages in Tercan District
Kurdish settlements in Erzincan Province